Self-insurance is a situation in which a person or business that is liable for some risk does not take out any third-party insurance, but rather chooses to bear the risk itself.

In the United States the concept applies especially to self-funded health care and may involve, for example, an employer providing certain benefits – generally health benefits or disability benefits – to employees and funding claims from a specified pool of assets rather than through an insurance company, as the term is traditionally used. In self-funded health care, the employer ultimately retains the full risk of paying claims, in contrast to traditional insurance, where all risk is transferred to the insurer.

See also 
 Insurance
 Risk management
 Third party administrator
 Self-funded health care
 List of insurance topics

Self insurance